Charing Cross is a major road junction in the Scottish city of Glasgow. It is situated north of the River Clyde at the intersection of Sauchiehall Street, St George's Road, Woodlands Road, North Street and Newton Street, as well as being at a major interchange of the M8 motorway.

Taking its name originally from a block of tenements named Charing Cross Place built in the 1850s, which continue at the south-west corner with North Street, the junction of Sauchiehall Street was formed as part of the original development of Blythswood Hill including Blythswood Square, St George's Road and North Street becoming known as Charing Cross, linking the city centre and the new West End, commencing at Woodlands and Sandyford.

Much of its architecture was destroyed when the motorway was built through it in the late 1960s, notably the Grand Hotel at its heart. It still marks the boundary between the City Centre and the West End of the city. There are ornate red sandstone tenement blocks dating from the late Victorian period at two corners of the junction, at the north-west (St George's Mansions, Frank Burnet) and south-east (Charing Cross Mansions, John James Burnet), while nearby landmarks include the Mitchell Library. In 2019, Glasgow City Council put forward plans to cover over more of the motorway (which is in a cutting through the area) with a parkland area to better connect the areas on each side.

Charing Cross was also part of the so-called Square Mile of Murder, the location of a series of sensational murders which scandalised Victorian society.

Charing Cross railway station is a short distance to the south; the nearest Glasgow Subway station is St George's Cross, located at the junction of the same name to the north of Charing Cross, also much diminished in its importance by the installation of the M8.

Nearby is an abstract concrete relief mural by Keith McCarter, made circa 1972.

Gallery

References

External links

Areas of Glasgow
Road junctions in Glasgow
Motorway junctions in the United Kingdom